The women's 3000 metres at the 2022 World Athletics U20 Championships was held at the Estadio Olímpico Pascual Guerrero on 1 August 2022.

Originally, 17 athletes from 11 countries entered to the competition, however, 15 of them competed. Nicola Hogg, from Australia, did not participate while the third runner entered by Ethiopia, Medina Eisa, was unable to compete (only two athletes per member nation can compete in each event).

Records
U20 standing records prior to the 2022 World Athletics U20 Championships were as follows:

Results
The final race started at 17:00 on 1 August 2022. The results were as follows:

References

3000 metres women
Long distance running at the World Athletics U20 Championships